Ali Nadhim Salman (born 15 December 1981) is an Iraqi Greco-Roman wrestler, best known for representing Iraq at London 2012 in the Men's 120kg Greco-Roman event. He was defeated in the qualification round by Bashir Babajanzadeh.

References

External links
 

1981 births
Living people
Sportspeople from Baghdad
Wrestlers at the 2012 Summer Olympics
Iraqi male sport wrestlers
Olympic wrestlers of Iraq
Asian Games medalists in wrestling
Wrestlers at the 2006 Asian Games
Wrestlers at the 2010 Asian Games
Wrestlers at the 2014 Asian Games
Asian Games bronze medalists for Iraq
Medalists at the 2010 Asian Games